Bhrigu Lake or Brighu Lake is a lake located at an elevation of around  in Kullu district, Himachal Pradesh, India. It can be reached by trekking either from the Vashishth temple, which is famous for its hot water springs, close to the town of Manali. Actually there is no settlement in Gulaba and is an area of the Pir Panjal mountain range. It is named after Maharishi Bhrigu. 

Legend has it that the sage used to meditate near the lake and hence it has been rendered sacred; the locals believe that due to this the lake never freezes completely. This lake is held sacred to the sage, Rishi Brighu, a great saint of Indian history. It lies on the various trek routes of the region.

See also
 Kullu district

References

External links
 Himachal Pradesh Tourism Department

Lakes of Himachal Pradesh
Geography of Kullu district
Manali, Himachal Pradesh